Crypto.com Arena is a multi-purpose indoor arena in Downtown Los Angeles.  The main attraction of the L.A. Live development, it is located next to the Los Angeles Convention Center complex along Figueroa Street. The arena opened on October 17, 1999; it was previously known as Staples Center until December 2021 when Crypto.com acquired the naming rights.

It is owned and operated by the Arturo L.A. Arena Company and Anschutz Entertainment Group. The arena is the home venue to the Los Angeles Kings of the National Hockey League (NHL), the Los Angeles Lakers and the Los Angeles Clippers of the National Basketball Association (NBA), and the Los Angeles Sparks of the Women's National Basketball Association (WNBA). The Los Angeles Avengers of the Arena Football League (AFL) and the South Bay Lakers of the NBA G League were also tenants; the Avengers folded in 2009, and the D-Fenders moved to the Lakers' practice facility at the Toyota Sports Center in El Segundo, California for the 2011–12 season. Crypto.com Arena is host to over 250 events and nearly 4 million guests each year. It is the only arena in the NBA shared by two teams, as well as one of only three North American professional sports venues to host two teams from the same league. MetLife Stadium, the home of the National Football League's New York Giants and New York Jets, and SoFi Stadium, the home of the National Football League's Los Angeles Rams and Los Angeles Chargers, are the others. Crypto.com Arena is the venue of the Grammy Awards ceremony and will host the basketball competition during the 2028 Summer Olympics. In 2024, the Clippers are scheduled to leave Crypto.com Arena for their own building, Intuit Dome.

Following the January 2020 death of NBA legend Kobe Bryant, his daughter Gianna, and 7 others in a helicopter crash, the city of Los Angeles designated August 24 as Kobe Bryant Day, on which they announced that between the boulevards of Olympic and Martin Luther King Jr., Figueroa Street will be renamed Kobe Bryant Boulevard to honor his memory; this area includes the address of Crypto.com Arena.

Description
The arena seats up to 19,067 for basketball, 18,340 for ice hockey, and around 20,000 for concerts or other sporting events. Two-thirds of the arena's seating, including 2,500 club seats, are in the lower bowl. There are also 160 luxury suites, including 15 event suites, on three levels between the lower and upper bowls. The arena's attendance record is held by the fight between World WBA Welterweight Champion Antonio Margarito and Shane Mosley with a crowd of 20,820, set on January 25, 2009.

Star Plaza 

Outside the arena at the Star Plaza are statues of famous Los Angeles athletes and broadcasters. Additionally, the Los Angeles Kings Monument was erected in Star Plaza in 2016.

An 11th statue, honoring Los Angeles Sparks center Lisa Leslie, is slated to be unveiled in the future.

Following is a list of statues on display:

History

The arena has been referred to as "the deal that almost wasn't."

Long before construction broke ground, plans for the arena were negotiated between elected city officials and real estate developers Edward P. Roski of Majestic Realty and Philip Anschutz. Roski and Anschutz had acquired the Los Angeles Kings in 1995 and in 1996 began looking for a new home for their team, which then played at the Forum in Inglewood.

Majestic Realty Co. and AEG were scouring the Los Angeles area for available land to develop an arena when they were approached by Steve Soboroff, then president of the LA Recreation and Parks Commission. Soboroff requested that they consider building the arena in downtown Los Angeles adjacent to the convention center. This proposal intrigued Roski and Anschutz, and soon a plan to develop the arena was devised.

Months of negotiations ensued between Anschutz and city officials, with Roski and John Semcken of Majestic Realty Co. spearheading the negotiations for the real estate developers. The negotiations grew contentious at times and the real estate developers threatened to pull out altogether on more than one occasion. The main opposition came from Councilman Joel Wachs, who opposed utilizing public funds to subsidize the proposed project, and councilwoman Rita Walters, who objected to parts of it.

Ultimately, the developers and city leaders reached an agreement, and in 1997, construction broke ground on the new building, which opened two years later. It was financed privately at a cost of US$375 million and is named for the office-supply company Staples, Inc., which was one of the center's corporate sponsors that paid for naming rights. Staples' 20-year naming rights deal was renewed in 2009. The arena opened on October 17, 1999, with a Bruce Springsteen & The E Street Band concert as its inaugural event.

On October 21, 2009, the arena celebrated its tenth anniversary. To commemorate the occasion, the venue's official web site nominated 25 of the arena's greatest moments from its first ten years with fans voting on the top ten.

During the late summer of 2010, modifications were made to the arena, including refurbished locker rooms for the Lakers, Kings, and Clippers and the installation of a new US$10 million HD center-hung video scoreboard and jumbotron, replacing the original one that had been in place since the building opened in 1999. The Panasonic Live 4HD scoreboard was officially unveiled on September 22, 2010, as AEG and Staples Center executives, as well as player representatives from the Lakers (Sasha Vujacic), Clippers (Craig Smith), and Kings (Matt Greene) were on hand for the presentation.

On January 15, 2018, in the aftermath of an NBA basketball game between the Houston Rockets and the Los Angeles Clippers, point guard Chris Paul utilized a secret tunnel (connecting the away team's locker room to the backdoor of the Clippers locker room) to confront former Clipper teammates Austin Rivers and Blake Griffin. Paul was joined by teammates Trevor Ariza, James Harden, and Gerald Green to confront the opponents, which only resulted in verbal altercations.

Following the sudden death of former basketball player Kobe Bryant in January 2020, a number of media outlets picked up on a phrase used by some, referring to the arena as "The House That Kobe Built", due to his historic 20-year career with the Lakers.

On November 16, 2021, it was announced that the naming rights to the Staples Center had been acquired by Singapore-based cryptocurrency exchange Crypto.com, renaming it Crypto.com Arena effective December 25, 2021 (with the changeover coinciding with the Lakers' nationally televised Christmas Day game). The deal was reported to be valued at $700 million over 20 years, in comparison to the $116 million paid by Staples under its previous 20-year agreement.

The arena will be renovated over a period of two years with renovations to be complete by 2024.

Events

Music
Bruce Springsteen & The E Street Band were the first act to perform at the venue on its opening in 1999. Dave Matthews Band famously played the venue twice in 2008, despite the first show being the day of founding member and saxophonist LeRoi Moore's death.

After his death in 2009, Michael Jackson's memorial service was held at the arena; its operator AEG had promoted the This Is It residency that Jackson had been scheduled to perform at The O2 Arena in London prior to his death. Rapper Nipsey Hussle's memorial service was also held at the venue on April 11, 2019.

It hosted the 1st Annual Latin Grammy Awards in 2000 and the 2012 MTV Video Music Awards. Mexican superstar Jenni Rivera, known as La Diva de la Banda, became the first Regional Mexican artist to sell out the Crypto.com Arena as the single headliner on September 3, 2011. She had two Surprise guests, Olga Tañón and Alejandra Guzman

Taylor Swift has performed 16 sellouts at Crypto.com Arena—the most of any performer at the venue. On August 21, 2015, prior to one of her performances on the 1989 Tour, Kobe Bryant presented Swift with a banner commemorating this achievement, which was hung in the arena's rafters. The Taylor Swift banner, however, became the subject of a curse among Lakers and Kings fans, who suspected that the banner was contributing to their teams' respective playoff droughts. Eventually, the Kings began to hide the Taylor Swift banner during home games, and the banner was taken down entirely in December 2020.

Mexican musicians Gloria Trevi and Alejandra Guzmán played two sellout shows at the arena in 2017. Green Day closed out the Super Bowl Music Fest on February 12, 2022. They played well past midnight, going past their planned setlist and improvising an encore of deep tracks.

Grammy Awards
The annual Grammy Awards ceremony has been held at Crypto.com Arena since 2000, with the exception of 2003, 2018, 2021 and 2022. As of 2023, the venue has hosted the Grammy Awards 20 times, hosting more than any other venue in the history of the Grammy Awards.

Sports
The venue opened in 1999 as the home of the Los Angeles Lakers and Los Angeles Clippers (NBA), and Los Angeles Kings of the NHL. The Los Angeles Sparks of the WNBA joined in 2001, while the Los Angeles D-Fenders of the NBA D-League joined in 2006. It became home to the Los Angeles Avengers of the Arena Football League in 2000 until the team's discontinuation in 2009.

Since its opening day, the arena has hosted seven NBA Finals series with the Lakers, the 2012 and 2014 Stanley Cup Finals, three WNBA Finals, the 2002 U.S. Figure Skating Championships, the 52nd and 62nd NHL All-Star game, three NBA All-Star Games (2004, 2011 and 2018), the Pac-10 Conference men's basketball tournament (2002–12), the WTA Tour Championships (2002–05), UFC 60 in 2006, UFC 104 in 2009, UFC 184 in 2015, UFC 227 in 2018, the 2009 World Figure Skating Championships, the Summer X Games indoor competitions (2003–13), and several HBO Championship Boxing matches.

On January 22, 2006, Los Angeles Lakers player Kobe Bryant scored a career-high 81 points in the Crypto.com Arena against the Toronto Raptors, the second-highest number of points scored in a single game in NBA history, second only to Wilt Chamberlain's 100-point performance. Of the team's six NBA championships since moving to the venue, the Lakers have celebrated their  and  victories at Crypto.com Arena with series-winning victories at home.

Prior to the 2006–07 NBA season, the lighting inside the arena was modified for Lakers games. The lights were focused only on the court itself (hence the promotional Lights Out campaign), reminiscent of the Lakers' early years at The Forum. The initial fan reaction was positive and has been a fixture on home games since. The Daktronics see-through shot clock was first installed prior to the 2008–09 NBA season. The Clippers adopted the new see-through shot clock prior to the 2010–11 NBA season. For Sparks games, the court used is named after Sparks player Lisa Leslie, and was officially named prior to the 2009 home opener against the Shock on June 23, 2006.

The Los Angeles Kings hosted the 2010 NHL Entry Draft at the arena in June 2010. In 2012, the Clippers, Kings, and Lakers all advanced to their leagues' respective playoffs, with the Kings ultimately playing their first Stanley Cup Finals at the arena; on June 11, the Kings defeated the New Jersey Devils in Game 6 to win their first Stanley Cup in franchise history.

The Lakers unveiled a new hardwood court before their preseason game on October 13, 2012. Taking a cue from soccer clubs, the primary center court logo was adorned with 16 stars, representing the 16 championships the Lakers franchise has won. A 17th star was added to the court and unveiled before their regular season opener on December 22, 2020, to represent the franchise winning its 17th championship in the 2020 NBA Finals.

Crypto.com Arena has hosted the following championship events:
NBA Finals:
: On June 19, 2000, the Lakers defeated the Indiana Pacers 116–111 in game 6, which took place at home, to win their twelfth championship title. This was also notable for being their first championship since .
 The Lakers hosted games 1 and 2 versus the Philadelphia 76ers
 The Lakers hosted games 1 and 2 versus the New Jersey Nets
 The Lakers hosted games 1 and 2 versus the Detroit Pistons
 The Lakers hosted games 3, 4 and 5 versus the Boston Celtics
 The Lakers hosted games 1 and 2 versus the Orlando Magic
: On June 17, 2010, the Lakers defeated the Boston Celtics 83–79 in game 7, which took place at home, to win their sixteenth championship title.
Stanley Cup Finals:
: On June 11, 2012, the Kings captured their first Stanley Cup in franchise history after defeating the New Jersey Devils 6–1 in game 6.
: On June 13, 2014, the Kings captured their second Stanley Cup in franchise history after defeating the New York Rangers 3–2 in double overtime of game 5.

In 2018, the arena hosted Monster Jam for the very first time. In 2019, the PBR Unleash the Beast Series hosted its Iron Cowboy event at the arena, marking the first PBR event to be held there. On June 9, 2019, the ACE Family hosted a charity basketball game against singer Chris Brown.

On November 9, 2019, the arena hosted KSI vs. Logan Paul II, a boxing event headlined by a rematch between the two YouTubers. On February 24, 2020, the arena hosted a celebration of life for Kobe Bryant and his daughter Gianna following the 2020 Calabasas helicopter crash. On November 28, 2020, the arena hosted the boxing event Mike Tyson vs. Roy Jones Jr.

2028 Summer Olympics
Crypto.com Arena is expected to host basketball during the 2028 Summer Olympics. Per IOC rules, the venue must be referred to under a generic name for the duration of the Games.

Esports 
In 2013 and 2016,  the arena hosted the finals of the League of Legends World Championship.

Professional wrestling
Along with hosting many episodes of Monday Night Raw and Friday Night SmackDown, such as the latter's debut on Fox on October 4, 2019, Crypto.com Arena has also hosted the following WWE pay-per-views:

Unforgiven (2002)
Judgment Day (2004)
WrestleMania 21
No Way Out (2007)
SummerSlam (2009, 2010, 2011, 2012, 2013, 2014)
Hell in a Cell (2015)
No Mercy (2017)
NXT TakeOver: WarGames (2018)
Survivor Series (2018)

A broadcast of WCW Monday Nitro was held at the arena on January 24, 2000.

The last WWE event the arena hosted before its name got changed to "Crypto.com Arena" was SmackDown on December 10, 2021. The arena will host SmackDown and the 2023 WWE Hall of Fame induction ceremony on March 31 as well as NXT Stand & Deliver on April 1 and Raw on April 3, as part of WrestleMania 39 weekend.

Politics

The 2000 Democratic National Convention was held at the venue.

Awards and recognitions
Staples Center was named Best Major Concert Venue for 1998 and Arena of the Year for 1999, 2000 and 2001 by Pollstar Magazine and has been nominated each year since 2000. In February 2013, PETA named the arena the most "vegetarian-friendly" arena in the NBA.

L.A. Live

The Crypto.com Arena is only a part of a  development by Anschutz Entertainment Group (AEG) adjoining the arena and the Los Angeles Convention Center. The development, known as L.A. Live, broke ground on September 15, 2005. L.A. Live is designed to offer entertainment, retail and residential programming in the downtown Los Angeles area.

Image gallery

See also

 Joel Wachs, Los Angeles City Council member who forged a deal to bring the sports arena to L.A.
 List of music venues in Los Angeles, a list of other music venues in Los Angeles.
 Crypto naming controversy

References

External links

AEG Worldwide
Time lapse video switching between sports

Sports venues in Los Angeles
Music venues in Los Angeles
Buildings and structures in Downtown Los Angeles
South Park (Downtown Los Angeles)
Basketball venues in Los Angeles
Boxing venues in Los Angeles
College basketball venues in the United States
Gymnastics venues in Los Angeles
Indoor arenas in Los Angeles
Indoor ice hockey venues in Los Angeles
Mixed martial arts venues in California
Wrestling venues in Los Angeles
Landmarks in Los Angeles
Anschutz Corporation
Los Angeles Avengers
Los Angeles Clippers venues
Los Angeles D-Fenders
Los Angeles Lakers venues
Los Angeles Sparks venues
National Basketball Association venues
National Hockey League venues
Defunct NBA G League venues
Sports venues completed in 1999
1999 establishments in California
1990s architecture in the United States
NBBJ buildings
Venues of the 2028 Summer Olympics
Olympic basketball venues
Grammy Award venues
Esports venues in California
Los Angeles Kings